Seb Calder is a New Zealand rugby union player who plays for the  in Super Rugby. His playing position is prop. He was named as a late inclusion in the Crusaders squad for Round 12 of the 2022 Super Rugby Pacific season. He made his debut for the Crusaders in the same match. He was previously a member of the Crusaders academy.

References

New Zealand rugby union players
Living people
Rugby union props
Crusaders (rugby union) players
Year of birth missing (living people)
Canterbury rugby union players